The 1880 United States House of Representatives elections were held for the most part on November 2, 1880, with five states holding theirs early between June and October. They coincided with the 1880 presidential election which was won by James A. Garfield, who was a member of the House at the time. Elections were held for 293 seats of the United States House of Representatives, representing 38 states, to serve in the 47th United States Congress. This was the first time that every state held their regular House elections on or before Election Day. Special elections were also held throughout the year.

Issues such as Civil War loyalties, tariffs, graft and corruption dominated the year's elections, though none became substantive a national issue. The economy was growing stronger after emerging from a long Depression. It was in this political environment that Garfield's Republican Party gained 19 seats and regained control of the House from the Democratic Party. The Greenback Party, an emerging party of workers and farmers, also lost seats in these elections, after gaining more than a dozen two years earlier.

Election summaries

Early election dates 

In 1845, Congress passed a law providing for a uniform nationwide date for choosing Presidential electors. This law did not affect election dates for Congress, which remained within the jurisdiction of State governments, but over time, the States moved their Congressional elections to this date as well.

In 1880, no states held their elections after Election Day for the first time (California was the last state to hold late elections, in 1878). But 5 states, with 35 seats among them, held their elections before the rest of the states:

 June 1 Texas
 June 7 Oregon
 September 7 Vermont
 September 13 Maine
 October 12 Ohio

Special elections

46th Congress 

|-
! 
| Alfred M. Lay
|  | Democratic
| 1878
|  | Incumbent died December 8, 1879.New member elected January 10, 1880.Democratic hold.Successor seated January 26, 1880.Successor later lost re-election to the next term, see below.
| nowrap | 

|-
! 
| Ray V. Pierce
|  | Republican
| 1878
|  | Incumbent resigned September 18, 1880.New member elected November 2, 1880.Democratic gain.Successor seated December 6, 1880.Successor also elected to the next term, see below.
| nowrap | 

|-
! 
| Burwell B. Lewis
|  | Democratic
| 18741876 1878
|  | Incumbent resigned October 1, 1880, to become President of the University of Alabama.New member elected sometime in 1880.Democratic hold.Successor seated December 8, 1880.Successor had not been a candidate to the next term, see below.
| nowrap | 

|-
! 
| James A. Garfield
|  | Republican
| 1862
|  | Incumbent resigned November 8, 1880, to become U.S. President.New member  November 30, 1880.Republican hold.Successor seated December 13, 1880.Successor had already been elected to the next term, see below.
| nowrap | 

|-
! 
| Evarts Worcester Farr
|  | Republican
| 1878
|  | Incumbent died November 30, 1880.New member elected December 28, 1880.Republican hold.Successor seated January 8, 1881.Successor was also elected to the next term.
| nowrap | 

|}

47th Congress 

|-
! 
| Evarts Worcester Farr
|  | Republican
| 1878
|  | Incumbent member-elect died November 30, 1880, having just been re-elected.New member elected December 28, 1880.Republican hold.Successor was also elected to finish the current term.
| nowrap | 

|}

Alabama 

|-
! 
| Thomas H. Herndon
|  | Democratic
| 1878
| Incumbent re-elected.
| nowrap | 

|-
! 
| Hilary A. Herbert
|  | Democratic
| 1876
| Incumbent re-elected.
| nowrap | 

|-
! 
| William J. Samford
|  | Democratic
| 1878
|  | Incumbent retired.New member elected.Democratic hold.
| nowrap | 

|-
! 
| Charles M. Shelley
|  | Democratic
| 1876
|  | Incumbent lost re-election.New member elected.Republican gain.
| nowrap | 

|-
! 
| Thomas Williams
|  | Democratic
| 1878
| Incumbent re-elected.
| nowrap | 

|-
! 
| Newton N. Clements
|  | Democratic
| 1880 
|  | Incumbent retired.New member elected.Democratic hold.
| nowrap | 

|-
! 
| William H. Forney
|  | Democratic
| 1874
| Incumbent re-elected.
| nowrap | 

|-
! 
| William M. Lowe
|  | Greenback
| 1878
| Incumbent re-elected.
| nowrap | 

|}

Arkansas 

|-
! 
| Poindexter Dunn
| 
| 1878
| Incumbent re-elected.
| nowrap | 

|-
! 
| William F. Slemons
| 
| 1874
|  | Incumbent retired.New member elected.Democratic hold.
| nowrap | 

|-
! 
| Jordan E. Cravens
| 
| 1876
| Incumbent re-elected.
| nowrap | 

|-
! 
| Thomas M. Gunter
| 
| 1872
| Incumbent re-elected.
| nowrap | 

|}

California 

|-
! 
| Horace Davis
|  | Republican
| 1876
|  | Incumbent lost re-election.New member elected.Democratic gain.
| nowrap | 

|-
! 
| Horace F. Page
|  | Republican
| 1872
| Incumbent re-elected.
| nowrap | 

|-
! 
| Campbell P. Berry
|  | Democratic
| 1879
| Incumbent re-elected.
| nowrap | 

|-
! 
| Romualdo Pacheco
|  | Republican
| 1876
| Incumbent re-elected.
| nowrap | 
|}

Colorado 

|-
! 
| James B. Belford
| 
| 1878
| Incumbent re-elected.
| nowrap | 

|}

Connecticut 

|-
! 
| Joseph R. Hawley
| 
| 1878
|  | Incumbent retired when elected U.S. senator.New member elected.Republican hold.
| nowrap | 

|-
! 
| James Phelps
| 
| 1875
| Incumbent re-elected.
| nowrap | 

|-
! 
| John T. Wait
| 
| 1876 
| Incumbent re-elected.
| nowrap | 

|-
! 
| Frederick Miles
| 
| 1878
| Incumbent re-elected.
| nowrap | 

|}

Delaware 

|-
! 
| Edward L. Martin
|  | Democratic
| 1878
| Incumbent re-elected.
| nowrap | 

|}

Florida 

|-
! 
| Robert H. M. Davidson
|  | Democratic
| 1876
| Incumbent re-elected.
| nowrap | 

|-
! rowspan=2 | 
| rowspan=2 | Noble A. Hull
| rowspan=2  | Democratic
| rowspan=2 | 1878
|  | Incumbent retired.New member elected.Democratic hold.
| nowrap | 
|-
|  | Election successfully contested.New member seated June 1, 1882.Republican gain.
| nowrap | 

|}

Georgia 

|-
! 
| John C. Nicholls
| 
| 1878
|  | Incumbent lost renomination.New member elected.Democratic hold.
| nowrap | 

|-
! 
| William E. Smith
| 
| 1874
|  | Incumbent retired.New member elected.Democratic hold.
| nowrap | 

|-
! 
| Philip Cook
| 
| 1872
| Incumbent re-elected.
| nowrap | 

|-
! 
| Henry Persons
|  | Independent Democratic
| 1878
|  | Incumbent retired.New member elected.Democratic gain.
| nowrap | 

|-
! 
| Nathaniel J. Hammond
| 
| 1878
| Incumbent re-elected.
| nowrap | 

|-
! 
| James H. Blount
| 
| 1872
| Incumbent re-elected.
| nowrap | 

|-
! 
| William H. Felton
|  | Independent Democratic
| 1874
|  | Incumbent lost re-election.New member elected.Democratic gain.
| nowrap | 

|-
! 
| Alexander H. Stephens
| 
| 1873 
| Incumbent re-elected.
| nowrap | 

|-
! 
| Emory Speer
|  | Independent Democratic
| 1878
| Incumbent re-elected.
| nowrap | 

|}

Illinois 

|-
! 
| William Aldrich
| 
| 1876
| Incumbent re-elected.
| nowrap | 

|-
! 
| George R. Davis
| 
| 1878
| Incumbent re-elected.
| nowrap | 

|-
! 
| Hiram Barber Jr.
| 
| 1878
|  | Incumbent lost renomination.New member elected.Republican hold.
| nowrap | 

|-
! 
| John C. Sherwin
| 
| 1878
| Incumbent re-elected.
| nowrap | 

|-
! 
| Robert M. A. Hawk
| 
| 1878
| Incumbent re-elected.
| nowrap | 

|-
! 
| Thomas J. Henderson
| 
| 1874
| Incumbent re-elected.
| nowrap | 

|-
! 
| Philip C. Hayes
| 
| 1876
|  | Incumbent retired.New member elected.Republican hold.
| nowrap | 

|-
! 
| Greenbury L. Fort
| 
| 1872
|  | Incumbent retired.New member elected.Republican hold.
| nowrap | 

|-
! 
| Thomas A. Boyd
| 
| 1876
|  | Incumbent retired.New member elected.Republican hold.
| nowrap | 

|-
! 
| Benjamin F. Marsh
| 
| 1876
| Incumbent re-elected.
| nowrap | 

|-
! 
| James W. Singleton
| 
| 1878
| Incumbent re-elected.
| nowrap | 

|-
! 
| William M. Springer
| 
| 1874
| Incumbent re-elected.
| nowrap | 

|-
! 
| Adlai Stevenson I
| 
| 1878
|  | Incumbent lost re-election.New member elected.Republican gain.
| nowrap | 

|-
! 
| Joseph G. Cannon
| 
| 1872
| Incumbent re-elected.
| nowrap | 

|-
! 
| Albert P. Forsythe
|  | Greenback
| 1878
|  | Incumbent lost re-election.New member elected.Democratic gain.
| nowrap | 

|-
! 
| William A. J. Sparks
| 
| 1874
| Incumbent re-elected.
| nowrap | 

|-
! 
| William R. Morrison
| 
| 1872
| Incumbent re-elected.
| nowrap | 

|-
! 
| John R. Thomas
| 
| 1878
| Incumbent re-elected.
| nowrap | 

|-
! 
| Richard W. Townshend
| 
| 1876
| Incumbent re-elected.
| nowrap | 

|}

Indiana 

|-
! 
| William Heilman
| 
| 1878
| Incumbent re-elected.
| nowrap | 

|-
! 
| Thomas R. Cobb
| 
| 1876
| Incumbent re-elected.
| nowrap | 

|-
! 
| George A. Bicknell
| 
| 1876
|  | Incumbent lost renomination.New member elected.Democratic hold.
| nowrap | 

|-
! 
| Jeptha D. New
| 
| 1878
|  | Incumbent retired.New member elected.Democratic hold.
| nowrap | 

|-
! 
| colspan=3 | None 
|  | New seat.New member elected.Democratic gain.
| nowrap | 

|-
! 
| Thomas M. Browne
| 
| 1876
| Incumbent re-elected.
| nowrap | 

|-
! 
| Gilbert De La Matyr
|  | Greenback
| 1878
|  | Incumbent lost re-election.New member elected.Republican gain.
| nowrap | 

|-
! 
| Abraham J. Hostetler
| 
| 1878
|  | Incumbent retired.New member elected.Republican gain.
| nowrap | 

|-
! rowspan=2 | 
| Godlove S. Orth
| 
| 1878
| Incumbent re-elected.
| rowspan=2 nowrap | 
|-
| William R. Myers
| 
| 1878
|  | Incumbent lost re-election.Democratic loss.

|-
! 
| colspan=3 | None 
|  | New seat.New member elected.Republican gain.
| nowrap | 

|-
! 
| Calvin Cowgill
| 
| 1878
|  | Incumbent retired.New member elected.Republican hold.
| nowrap | 

|-
! 
| Walpole G. Colerick
| 
| 1878
| Incumbent re-elected.
| nowrap | 

|-
! rowspan=2 | 
| John Baker
| 
| 1874
|  | Incumbent retired.Republican loss.
| rowspan=2 nowrap | 
|-
| William H. Calkins
| 
| 1876
| Incumbent re-elected.

|}

Iowa 

|-
! 
| Moses A. McCoid
| 
| 1878
| Incumbent re-elected.
| nowrap | 

|-
! 
| Hiram Price
| 
| 1876
|  | Incumbent retired.New member elected.Republican hold.
| nowrap | 

|-
! 
| Thomas Updegraff
| 
| 1878
| Incumbent re-elected.
| nowrap | 

|-
! 
| Nathaniel C. Deering
| 
| 1876
| Incumbent re-elected.
| nowrap | 

|-
! 
| William G. Thompson
| 
| 1879 
| Incumbent re-elected.
| nowrap | 

|-
! rowspan=2 | 
| rowspan=2 | James B. Weaver
| rowspan=2  | Greenback
| rowspan=2 | 1878
|  | Incumbent retired to run for U.S. President.New member elected.Republican gain.
| nowrap | 
|-
|  | Election successfully contested.New member seated March 3, 1883.Democratic gain.
| nowrap | 

|-
! 
| Edward H. Gillette
|  | Greenback
| 1878
|  | Incumbent lost re-election.New member elected.Republican gain.
| nowrap | 

|-
! 
| William F. Sapp
| 
| 1876
|  | Incumbent lost renomination.New member elected.Republican hold.
| nowrap | 

|-
! 
| Cyrus C. Carpenter
| 
| 1878
| Incumbent re-elected.
| nowrap | 

|}

Kansas 

|-
! 
| John A. Anderson
| 
| 1878
| Incumbent re-elected.
| nowrap | 

|-
! 
| Dudley C. Haskell
| 
| 1876
| Incumbent re-elected.
| nowrap | 

|-
! 
| Thomas Ryan
| 
| 1876
| Incumbent re-elected.
| nowrap | 

|}

Kentucky 

|-
! 
| Oscar Turner
|  | Independent Democratic
| 1878
|  | Incumbent re-elected as a Democrat.Democratic gain.
| nowrap | 

|-
! 
| James A. McKenzie
| 
| 1876
| Incumbent re-elected.
| nowrap | 

|-
! 
| John W. Caldwell
| 
| 1876
| Incumbent re-elected.
| nowrap | 

|-
! 
| J. Proctor Knott
| 
| 1874
| Incumbent re-elected.
| nowrap | 

|-
! 
| Albert S. Willis
| 
| 1876
| Incumbent re-elected.
| nowrap | 

|-
! 
| John G. Carlisle
| 
| 1876
| Incumbent re-elected.
| nowrap | 

|-
! 
| Joseph C. S. Blackburn
| 
| 1874
| Incumbent re-elected.
| nowrap | 

|-
! 
| Philip B. Thompson Jr.
| 
| 1878
| Incumbent re-elected.
| nowrap | 

|-
! 
| Thomas Turner
| 
| 1876
|  | Incumbent lost re-election.New member elected.Republican gain.
| nowrap | 

|-
! 
| Elijah Phister
| 
| 1878
| Incumbent re-elected.
| nowrap | 

|}

Louisiana 

|-
! 
| Randall L. Gibson
| 
| 1874
| Incumbent re-elected.
| nowrap | 

|-
! 
| E. John Ellis
| 
| 1874
| Incumbent re-elected.
| nowrap | 

|-
! 
| Joseph H. Acklen
| 
| 1876
|  | Incumbent retired.New member elected.Republican gain.
| nowrap | 

|-
! 
| Joseph B. Elam
| 
| 1876
|  | Incumbent retired.New member elected.Democratic hold.
| nowrap | 

|-
! 
| J. Floyd King
| 
| 1878
| Incumbent re-elected.
| nowrap | 

|-
! 
| Edward W. Robertson
| 
| 1876
| Incumbent re-elected.
| nowrap | 

|}

Maine 

Maine held elections for its five members on September 13, 1880.

|-
! 
| Thomas B. Reed
| 
| 1876
| Incumbent re-elected.
| nowrap | 

|-
! 
| William P. Frye
| 
| 1870
| Incumbent re-elected.
| nowrap | 

|-
! 
| Stephen Lindsey
| 
| 1876
| Incumbent re-elected.
| nowrap | 

|-
! 
| George W. Ladd
|  | Greenback
| 1878
| Incumbent re-elected.
| nowrap | 

|-
! 
| Thompson H. Murch
|  | Greenback
| 1878
| Incumbent re-elected.
| nowrap | 

|}

Maryland 

|-
! 
| Daniel M. Henry
| 
| 1876
|  | Incumbent retired.New member elected.Democratic hold.
| nowrap | 

|-
! 
| Joshua F. C. Talbott
| 
| 1878
| Incumbent re-elected.
| nowrap | 

|-
! 
| William Kimmel
| 
| 1876
|  | Incumbent retired.New member elected.Democratic hold.
| nowrap | 

|-
! 
| Robert M. McLane
| 
| 1878
| Incumbent re-elected.
| nowrap | 

|-
! 
| Eli J. Henkle
| 
| 1874
|  | Incumbent retired.New member elected.Democratic hold.
| nowrap | 

|-
! 
| Milton Urner
| 
| 1878
| Incumbent re-elected.
| nowrap | 

|}

Massachusetts 

|-
! 
| William W. Crapo
|  | Republican
| 1874
| Incumbent re-elected.
| nowrap | 

|-
! 
| Benjamin W. Harris
|  | Republican
| 1872
| Incumbent re-elected.
| nowrap | 

|-
! 
| Walbridge A. Field
|  | Republican
| 1878
|  | Incumbent retired.New member elected.Republican hold.
| nowrap | 

|-
! 
| Leopold Morse
|  | Democratic
| 1876
| Incumbent re-elected.
| nowrap | 

|-
! 
| Selwyn Z. Bowman
|  | Republican
| 1878
| Incumbent re-elected.
| nowrap | 

|-
! 
| George B. Loring
|  | Republican
| 1876
|  | Incumbent lost renomination.New member elected.Republican hold.
| nowrap | 

|-
! 
| William A. Russell
|  | Republican
| 1878
| Incumbent re-elected.
| nowrap | 

|-
! 
| William Claflin
|  | Republican
| 1876
|  | Incumbent retired.New member elected.Republican hold.
| nowrap | 

|-
! 
| William W. Rice
|  | Republican
| 1876
| Incumbent re-elected.
| nowrap | 

|-
! 
| Amasa Norcross
|  | Republican
| 1876
| Incumbent re-elected.
| nowrap | 

|-
! 
| George D. Robinson
|  | Republican
| 1876
| Incumbent re-elected.
| nowrap | 

|}

Michigan 

|-
! 
| John S. Newberry
| 
| 1878
|  | Incumbent retired.New member elected.Republican hold.
| nowrap | 

|-
! 
| Edwin Willits
| 
| 1876
| Incumbent re-elected.
| nowrap | 

|-
! 
| Jonas H. McGowan
| 
| 1876
|  | Incumbent retired.New member elected.Republican hold.
| nowrap | 

|-
! 
| Julius C. Burrows
| 
| 1878
| Incumbent re-elected.
| nowrap | 

|-
! 
| John W. Stone
| 
| 1876
|  | Incumbent retired.New member elected.Republican hold.
| nowrap | 

|-
! 
| Mark S. Brewer
| 
| 1876
|  | Incumbent retired.New member elected.Republican hold.
| nowrap | 

|-
! 
| Omar D. Conger
| 
| 1868
| Incumbent re-elected.
| nowrap | 

|-
! 
| Roswell G. Horr
| 
| 1878
| Incumbent re-elected.
| nowrap | 

|-
! 
| Jay A. Hubbell
| 
| 1872
| Incumbent re-elected.
| nowrap | 

|}

Minnesota 

|-
! 
| Mark H. Dunnell
| 
| 1870
| Incumbent re-elected.
| nowrap | 

|-
! 
| Henry Poehler
| 
| 1878
|  | Incumbent lost re-election.New member elected.Republican gain.
| nowrap | 

|-
! 
| William D. Washburn
| 
| 1878
| Incumbent re-elected.
| nowrap | 

|}

Mississippi 

|-
! 
| Henry L. Muldrow
|  | Democratic
| 1876
| Incumbent re-elected.
| nowrap | 

|-
! 
| Van. H. Manning
|  | Democratic
| 1876
| Incumbent re-elected.
| nowrap | 

|-
! 
| Hernando Money
|  | Democratic
| 1874
| Incumbent re-elected.
| nowrap | 

|-
! 
| Otho R. Singleton
|  | Democratic
| 1874
| Incumbent re-elected.
| nowrap | 

|-
! 
| Charles E. Hooker
|  | Democratic
| 1874
| Incumbent re-elected.
| nowrap | 

|-
! rowspan=2 | 
| rowspan=2 | James R. Chalmers
| rowspan=2  | Democratic
| rowspan=2 | 1876
| Incumbent re-elected.
| nowrap | 
|-
|  | Election successfully contested.New member seated April 29, 1882.Republican gain.
| nowrap | 
|}

Missouri 

|-
! 
| Martin L. Clardy
| 
| 1878
| Incumbent re-elected.
| nowrap | 

|-
! 
| Erastus Wells
| 
| 1878
|  | Incumbent retired.New member elected.Democratic hold.
| nowrap | 

|-
! rowspan=2 | 
| rowspan=2 | Richard G. Frost
| rowspan=2 
| rowspan=2 | 1878
| Incumbent re-elected.
| nowrap | 
|-
|  | Election successfully contested.New member seated March 2, 1883.Republican gain.
| nowrap | 

|-
! 
| Lowndes H. Davis
| 
| 1878
| Incumbent re-elected.
| nowrap | 

|-
! 
| Richard P. Bland
| 
| 1872
| Incumbent re-elected.
| nowrap | 

|-
! 
| James R. Waddill
| 
| 1878
|  | Incumbent lost re-election.New member elected.Greenback gain.
| nowrap | 

|-
! 
| John F. Philips
| 
| 1880 
|  | Incumbent lost re-election.New member elected.Greenback gain.
| nowrap | 

|-
! 
| Samuel L. Sawyer
| 
| 1878
|  | Incumbent retired.New member elected.Republican gain.
| nowrap | 

|-
! 
| Nicholas Ford
|  | Greenback
| 1878
| Incumbent re-elected.
| nowrap | 

|-
! 
| Gideon F. Rothwell
| 
| 1878
|  | Incumbent lost renomination.New member elected.Greenback gain.
| nowrap | 

|-
! 
| John B. Clark Jr.
| 
| 1872
| Incumbent re-elected.
| nowrap | 

|-
! 
| William H. Hatch
| 
| 1878
| Incumbent re-elected.
| nowrap | 

|-
! 
| Aylett H. Buckner
| 
| 1872
| Incumbent re-elected.
| nowrap | 

|}

Nebraska 

|-
! 
| Edward K. Valentine
|  | Republican 
| 1878
| Incumbent re-elected.
| nowrap | 

|}

Nevada 

|-
! 
| Rollin M. Daggett
| 
| 1878
|  | Incumbent lost re-election.New member elected.Democratic gain.
| nowrap | 

|}

New Hampshire 

|-
! 
| Joshua G. Hall
| 
| 1878
| Incumbent re-elected.
| nowrap | 

|-
! 
| James F. Briggs
| 
| 1877
| Incumbent re-elected.
| nowrap | 

|-
! 
| Evarts W. Farr
| 
| 1878
| Incumbent re-elected.
| nowrap | 

|}

New Jersey 

|-
! 
| George M. Robeson
| 
| 1878
| Incumbent re-elected.
| nowrap | 

|-
! 
| Hezekiah B. Smith
| 
| 1878
|  | Incumbent lost re-election.New member elected.Republican gain.
| nowrap | 

|-
! 
| Miles Ross
| 
| 1874
| Incumbent re-elected.
| nowrap | 

|-
! 
| Alvah A. Clark
| 
| 1876
|  | Incumbent retired.New member elected.Democratic hold.
| nowrap | 

|-
! 
| Charles H. Voorhis
| 
| 1878
|  | Incumbent retired.New member elected.Republican hold.
| nowrap | 

|-
! 
| John L. Blake
| 
| 1878
|  | Incumbent retired.New member elected.Republican hold.
| nowrap | 

|-
! 
| Lewis A. Brigham
| 
| 1878
|  | Incumbent lost re-election.New member elected.Democratic gain.
| nowrap | 

|}

New York 

|-
! 
| James W. Covert
| 
| 1876
|  | Incumbent retired.New member elected.Democratic hold.
| nowrap | 

|-
! 
| Daniel O'Reilly
|  | Independent Democratic
| 1878
|  | Incumbent lost re-election.New member elected.Democratic gain.
| nowrap | 

|-
! 
| Simeon B. Chittenden
| 
| 1874 
|  | Incumbent lost re-election.New member elected.Independent gain.
| nowrap | 

|-
! 
| Archibald M. Bliss
| 
| 1874
| Incumbent re-elected.
| nowrap | 

|-
! 
| Nicholas Muller
| 
| 1876
|  | Incumbent lost renomination.New member elected.Democratic hold.
| nowrap | 

|-
! 
| Samuel S. Cox
| 
| 1873 
| Incumbent re-elected.
| nowrap | 

|-
! 
| Edwin Einstein
| 
| 1878
|  | Incumbent retired.New member elected.Democratic gain.
| nowrap | 

|-
! 
| Anson G. McCook
| 
| 1876
| Incumbent re-elected.
| nowrap | 

|-
! 
| Fernando Wood
| 
| 1866
| Incumbent re-elected.
| nowrap | 

|-
! 
| James O'Brien
|  | Independent Democratic
| 1878
|  | Incumbent lost renomination.New member elected.Democratic gain.
| nowrap | 

|-
! 
| Levi P. Morton
| 
| 1878
| Incumbent re-elected.
| nowrap | 

|-
! 
| Waldo Hutchins
| 
| 1879 
| Incumbent re-elected.
| nowrap | 

|-
! 
| John H. Ketcham
| 
| 1876
| Incumbent re-elected.
| nowrap | 

|-
! 
| John W. Ferdon
| 
| 1878
|  | Incumbent retired.New member elected.Democratic gain.
| nowrap | 

|-
! 
| William Lounsbery
| 
| 1878
|  | Incumbent retired.New member elected.Republican gain.
| nowrap | 

|-
! 
| John M. Bailey
| 
| 1878 
|  | Incumbent retired.New member elected.Democratic gain.
| nowrap | 

|-
! 
| Walter A. Wood
| 
| 1878
| Incumbent re-elected.
| nowrap | 

|-
! 
| John Hammond
| 
| 1878
| Incumbent re-elected.
| nowrap | 

|-
! 
| Amaziah B. James
| 
| 1876
|  | Incumbent retired.New member elected.Republican hold.
| nowrap | 

|-
! 
| John H. Starin
| 
| 1876
|  | Incumbent retired.New member elected.Republican hold.
| nowrap | 

|-
! 
| David Wilber
| 
| 1878
|  | Incumbent retired.New member elected.Republican hold.
| nowrap | 

|-
! 
| Warner Miller
| 
| 1878
| Incumbent re-elected.
| nowrap | 

|-
! 
| Cyrus D. Prescott
| 
| 1878
| Incumbent re-elected.
| nowrap | 

|-
! 
| Joseph Mason
| 
| 1878
| Incumbent re-elected.
| nowrap | 

|-
! 
| Frank Hiscock
| 
| 1876
| Incumbent re-elected.
| nowrap | 

|-
! 
| John H. Camp
| 
| 1876
| Incumbent re-elected.
| nowrap | 

|-
! 
| Elbridge G. Lapham
| 
| 1874
| Incumbent re-elected.
| nowrap | 

|-
! 
| Jeremiah W. Dwight
| 
| 1876
| Incumbent re-elected.
| nowrap | 

|-
! 
| David P. Richardson
| 
| 1878
| Incumbent re-elected.
| nowrap | 

|-
! 
| John Van Voorhis
| 
| 1878
| Incumbent re-elected.
| nowrap | 

|-
! 
| Richard Crowley
| 
| 1878
| Incumbent re-elected.
| nowrap | 

|-
! 
| colspan=3 | Vacant
|  | Rep. Ray V. Pierce (R) resigned September 18, 1880.New member elected.Democratic gain.
| nowrap | 

|-
! 
| Henry Van Aernam
| 
| 1878
| Incumbent re-elected.
| nowrap | 

|}

North Carolina 

|-
! 
| Jesse J. Yeates
| 
| 1874
|  | Incumbent retired.New member elected.Democratic hold.
| nowrap | 

|-
! 
| William H. Kitchin
| 
| 1878
|  | Incumbent lost re-election.New member elected.Republican gain.
| nowrap | 

|-
! 
| Daniel L. Russell
|  | Greenback
| 1878
|  | Incumbent retired.New member elected.Democratic gain.
| nowrap | 

|-
! 
| Joseph J. Davis
| 
| 1874
|  | Incumbent retired.New member elected.Democratic hold.
| nowrap | 

|-
! 
| Alfred M. Scales
| 
| 1874
| Incumbent re-elected.
| nowrap | 

|-
! 
| Walter L. Steele
| 
| 1876
|  | Incumbent retired.New member elected.Democratic hold.
| nowrap | 

|-
! 
| Robert F. Armfield
| 
| 1878
| Incumbent re-elected.
| nowrap | 

|-
! 
| Robert B. Vance
| 
| 1872
| Incumbent re-elected.
| nowrap | 

|}

Ohio 

Ohio held elections for its twenty members on October 12, 1880.

|-
! 
| Benjamin Butterworth
| 
| 1878
| Incumbent re-elected.
| nowrap | 

|-
! 
| Thomas L. Young
| 
| 1878
| Incumbent re-elected.
| nowrap | 

|-
! 
| William D. Hill
| 
| 1878
|  | Incumbent retired.New member elected.Republican gain.
| nowrap | 

|-
! 
| John A. McMahon
| 
| 1874
|  | Incumbent lost re-election.New member elected.Republican gain.
| nowrap | 

|-
! 
| Benjamin Le Fevre
| 
| 1878
| Incumbent re-elected.
| nowrap | 

|-
! 
| Frank H. Hurd
| 
| 1878
|  | Incumbent lost re-election.New member elected.Republican gain.
| nowrap | 

|-
! 
| Ebenezer B. Finley
| 
| 1878
|  | Incumbent retired.New member elected.Democratic hold.
| nowrap | 

|-
! 
| J. Warren Keifer
| 
| 1876
| Incumbent re-elected.
| nowrap | 

|-
! 
| Henry L. Dickey
| 
| 1878
|  | Incumbent retired.New member elected.Republican gain.
| nowrap | 

|-
! 
| Thomas Ewing Jr.
| 
| 1876
|  | Incumbent retired.New member elected.Republican gain.
| nowrap | 

|-
! 
| Henry S. Neal
| 
| 1876
| Incumbent re-elected.
| nowrap | 

|-
! 
| George L. Converse
| 
| 1878
| Incumbent re-elected.
| nowrap | 

|-
! 
| Gibson Atherton
| 
| 1878
| Incumbent re-elected.
| nowrap | 

|-
! 
| George W. Geddes
| 
| 1878
| Incumbent re-elected.
| nowrap | 

|-
! 
| Adoniram J. Warner
| 
| 1878
|  | Incumbent lost re-election.New member elected.Republican gain.
| nowrap | 

|-
! 
| Jonathan T. Updegraff
| 
| 1878
| Incumbent re-elected.
| nowrap | 

|-
! 
| William McKinley
| 
| 1876
| Incumbent re-elected.
| nowrap | 

|-
! 
| James Monroe
| 
| 1870
|  | Incumbent retired.New member elected.Republican hold.
| nowrap | 

|-
! 
| James A. Garfield
| 
| 1862
|  | Incumbent retired to run for U.S. President.New member elected.Republican hold.
| nowrap | 

|-
! 
| Amos Townsend
| 
| 1876
| Incumbent re-elected.
| nowrap | 

|}

Oregon 

Oregon held its election early on June 7, 1880.

|-
! 
| John Whiteaker
| 
| 1878
|  | Incumbent lost re-election.New member elected.Republican gain.
| nowrap | 

|}

Pennsylvania 

|-
! 
| Henry H. Bingham
| 
| 1878
| Incumbent re-elected.
| nowrap | 

|-
! 
| Charles O'Neill
| 
| 1872
| Incumbent re-elected.
| nowrap | 

|-
! 
| Samuel J. Randall
| 
| 1862
| Incumbent re-elected.
| nowrap | 

|-
! 
| William D. Kelley
| 
| 1860
| Incumbent re-elected.
| nowrap | 

|-
! 
| Alfred C. Harmer
| 
| 1876
| Incumbent re-elected.
| nowrap | 

|-
! 
| William Ward
| 
| 1876
| Incumbent re-elected.
| nowrap | 

|-
! 
| William Godshalk
| 
| 1878
| Incumbent re-elected.
| nowrap | 

|-
! 
| Hiester Clymer
| 
| 1872
|  | Incumbent retired.New member elected.Democratic hold.
| nowrap | 

|-
! 
| A. Herr Smith
| 
| 1872
| Incumbent re-elected.
| nowrap | 

|-
! 
| Reuben K. Bachman
| 
| 1878
|  | Incumbent retired.New member elected.Democratic hold.
| nowrap | 

|-
! 
| Robert Klotz
| 
| 1878
| Incumbent re-elected.
| nowrap | 

|-
! 
| Hendrick B. Wright
|  | Greenback
| 1876
|  | Incumbent lost re-election.New member elected.Republican gain.
| nowrap | 

|-
! 
| John W. Ryon
| 
| 1878
|  | Incumbent lost re-election.New member elected.Greenback gain.
| nowrap | 

|-
! 
| John W. Killinger
| 
| 1876
|  | Incumbent retired.New member elected.Republican hold.
| nowrap | 

|-
! 
| Edward Overton Jr.
| 
| 1876
|  | Incumbent lost renomination.New member elected.Republican hold.
| nowrap | 

|-
! 
| John I. Mitchell
| 
| 1876
|  | Incumbent retired to run for U.S. senator.New member elected.Republican hold.
| nowrap | 

|-
! 
| Alexander H. Coffroth
| 
| 1878
|  | Incumbent lost re-election.New member elected.Republican gain.
| nowrap | 

|-
! 
| Horatio G. Fisher
| 
| 1878
| Incumbent re-elected.
| nowrap | 

|-
! 
| Frank E. Beltzhoover
| 
| 1878
| Incumbent re-elected.
| nowrap | 

|-
! 
| Seth H. Yocum
|  | Greenback
| 1878
|  | Incumbent retired.New member elected.Democratic gain.
| nowrap | 

|-
! 
| Morgan W. Rise
| 
| 1878
| Incumbent re-elected.
| nowrap | 

|-
! 
| Russell Errett
| 
| 1876
| Incumbent re-elected.
| nowrap | 

|-
! 
| Thomas M. Bayne
| 
| 1876
| Incumbent re-elected.
| nowrap | 

|-
! 
| William S. Shallenberger
| 
| 1876
| Incumbent re-elected.
| nowrap | 

|-
! 
| Harry White
| 
| 1876
|  | Incumbent lost re-election.New member elected.Greenback gain.
| nowrap | 

|-
! 
| Samuel B. Dick
| 
| 1878
|  | Incumbent retired.New member elected.Republican hold.
| nowrap | 

|-
! 
| James H. Osmer
| 
| 1878
|  | Incumbent retired.New member elected.Republican hold.
| nowrap | 

|}

Rhode Island 

|-
! 
| Nelson W. Aldrich
| 
| 1878
| Incumbent re-elected.
| nowrap | 

|-
! 
| Latimer W. Ballou
| 
| 1874
|  | Incumbent retired.New member elected.Republican hold.
| nowrap | 

|}

South Carolina 

|-
! 
| John S. Richardson
|  | Democratic
| 1878
| Incumbent re-elected.
| nowrap | 

|-
! 
| Michael P. O'Connor
|  | Democratic
| 1878
| Incumbent re-elected.
| nowrap | 

|-
! 
| D. Wyatt Aiken
|  | Democratic
| 1876
| Incumbent re-elected.
| nowrap | 

|-
! 
| John H. Evins
|  | Democratic
| 1876
| Incumbent re-elected.
| nowrap | 

|-
! 
| George D. Tillman
|  | Democratic
| 1878
| Incumbent re-elected.
| nowrap | 
|}

Tennessee 

|-
! 
| Robert L. Taylor
|  | Democratic
| 1878
|  |Incumbent lost re-election.New member elected.Republican gain.
| nowrap | 

|-
! 
| Leonidas C. Houk
|  | Republican
| 1878
| Incumbent re-elected.
| nowrap | 

|-
! 
| George G. Dibrell
|  | Democratic
| 1874
| Incumbent re-elected.
| nowrap | 

|-
! 
| Benton McMillin
|  | Democratic
| 1878
| Incumbent re-elected.
|  nowrap | 

|-
! 
| John M. Bright
|  | Democratic
| 1870
|  |Incumbent lost re-election as an Independent Democrat.New member elected.Democratic hold.
| nowrap | 

|-
! 
| John F. House
|  | Democratic
| 1874
| Incumbent re-elected.
| nowrap | 

|-
! 
| Washington C. Whitthorne
|  | Democratic
| 1870
| Incumbent re-elected.
| nowrap | 

|-
! 
| John D. C. Atkins
|  | Democratic
| 1872
| Incumbent re-elected.
| nowrap | 

|-
! 
| Charles B. Simonton
|  | Democratic
| 1878
| Incumbent re-elected.
| nowrap | 

|-
! 
| H. Casey Young
|  | Democratic
| 1874
|  |Incumbent lost re-election.New member elected.Republican gain.
| 

|}

Texas 

Texas held elections for its six members on June 1, 1880.

|-
! 
| John H. Reagan
| 
| 1874
| Incumbent re-elected.
| nowrap | 

|-
! 
| David B. Culberson
| 
| 1874
| Incumbent re-elected.
| nowrap | 

|-
! 
| Olin Wellborn
| 
| 1878
| Incumbent re-elected.
| nowrap | 

|-
! 
| Roger Q. Mills
| 
| 1872
| Incumbent re-elected.
| nowrap | 

|-
! 
| George W. Jones
|  | Greenback
| 1878
| Incumbent re-elected.
| nowrap | 

|-
! 
| Christopher C. Upson
| 
| 1879 
| Incumbent re-elected.
| nowrap | 

|}

Vermont 

Vermont held elections for its three members on September 7, 1880.

|-
! 
| Charles H. Joyce
| 
| 1874
| Incumbent re-elected.
| nowrap | 

|-
! 
| James M. Tyler
| 
| 1878
| Incumbent re-elected.
| nowrap | 

|-
! 
| Bradley Barlow
|  | Greenback
| 1878
|  | Incumbent retired.New member elected.Republican gain.
| nowrap | 

|}

Virginia 

|-
! 
| Richard L. T. Beale
| 
| 1879 
|  | Incumbent retired.New member elected.Democratic hold.
| nowrap | 

|-
! 
| John Goode
| 
| 1874
|  | Incumbent lost re-election.New member elected.Republican gain.
| nowrap | 

|-
! 
| Joseph E. Johnston
| 
| 1878
|  | Incumbent retired.New member elected.Democratic hold.
| nowrap | 

|-
! 
| Joseph Jorgensen
| 
| 1876
| Incumbent re-elected.
| nowrap | 

|-
! 
| George Cabell
| 
| 1874
| Incumbent re-elected.
| nowrap | 

|-
! 
| John R. Tucker
| 
| 1874
| Incumbent re-elected.
| nowrap | 

|-
! 
| John T. Harris
| 
| 1872
|  | Incumbent retired.New member elected.Readjuster gain.
| nowrap | 

|-
! 
| Eppa Hunton
| 
| 1872
|  | Incumbent retired.New member elected.Democratic hold.
| nowrap | 

|-
! 
| James B. Richmond
| 
| 1878
|  | Incumbent lost renomination.New member elected.Readjuster gain.
| nowrap | 

|}

West Virginia 

|-
! 
| Benjamin Wilson
|  | Democratic
| 1874
| Incumbent re-elected.
| nowrap | 

|-
! 
| Benjamin F. Martin
|  | Democratic
| 1876
|  | Incumbent lost renomination.New member elected.Democratic hold.
| nowrap | 

|-
! 
| John E. Kenna
|  | Democratic
| 1876
| Incumbent re-elected.
| nowrap | 

|}

Wisconsin 

Wisconsin elected eight members of congress on Election Day, November 2, 1880.

|-
! 
| Charles G. Williams
|  | Republican
| 1872
| Incumbent re-elected.
| nowrap | 

|-
! 
| Lucien B. Caswell
|  | Republican
| 1874
| Incumbent re-elected.
| nowrap | 

|-
! 
| George C. Hazelton
|  | Republican
| 1876
| Incumbent re-elected.
| nowrap | 

|-
! 
| Peter V. Deuster
|  | Democratic
| 1878
| Incumbent re-elected.
| nowrap | 

|-
! 
| Edward S. Bragg
|  | Democratic
| 1876
| Incumbent re-elected.
| nowrap | 

|-
! 
| Gabriel Bouck
|  | Democratic
| 1876
| |  Incumbent lost re-election.New member elected.Republican gain.
| nowrap | 

|-
! 
| Herman L. Humphrey
|  | Republican
| 1876
| Incumbent re-elected.
| nowrap | 

|-
! 
| Thaddeus C. Pound
|  | Republican
| 1876
| Incumbent re-elected.
| nowrap | 

|}

Non-voting delegates 

|-
! 
| John G. Campbell
| 
| 1878
|  | Incumbent retired.New member elected.Democratic hold.
| nowrap | 

|-
! 
| Granville G. Bennett
| 
| 1878
|  | Incumbent retired.New member elected.Republican hold.
| nowrap | 

|-
! 
| George Ainslie
|  | Democratic
| 1878
| Incumbent re-elected.
| nowrap | 

|-
! 
| Martin Maginnis
|  | Democratic
| 1872
| Incumbent re-elected.
| nowrap | 

|-
! 
| Mariano S. Otero
| 
| 1878
|  | Incumbent retired.New member elected.Republican hold.
| nowrap | 

|-
! rowspan=2 | 
| rowspan=2 | George Q. Cannon
| rowspan=2 
| rowspan=2 | 1872
| Incumbent re-elected.
| rowspan=2 nowrap | 
|-
|  | Election successfully contested by Allen G. Campbell (D).Congress refused to seat representative-elect.Republican loss.

|-
! 
| Thomas H. Brents
| 
| 1878
| Incumbent re-elected.
| nowrap | 

|-
! 
| Stephen W. Downey
|  | Republican
| 1878
|  | Incumbent retired.New member elected.Democratic gain.
| nowrap | 

|}

See also 
 1880 United States elections
 1880 United States presidential election
 1880–81 United States Senate elections
 1881 United States House of Representatives elections
 46th United States Congress
 47th United States Congress

Notes

References

Bibliography

External links
 Office of the Historian (Office of Art & Archives, Office of the Clerk, U.S. House of Representatives)